Coleophora stegosaurus is a moth of the family Coleophoridae. It is found in Uzbekistan.

The larvae feed on Lycium ruthenicum. They create a leafy case, consisting of up to 20 pieces of leaf. The pieces are glued together only on the upper side. The entire lower side of the case consists only of a silky network. The valve is two-sided. The color of the silky base of the case is chocolate-brown, while the leafy pieces are chocolate-brown to yellow. Larvae can be found from the end of May to October.

References

External links

stegosaurus
Moths of Asia
Endemic fauna of Uzbekistan
Moths described in 1972